I Live with Me Dad is a 1985 TV movie, produced by Crawfords Australia. The film is about six-year-old Crispy who lives with his destitute father Sid (Hehir). Based on a true story, it follows the street adventures of a father and son and his unconventional upbringing. A heart warming film that explores the extraordinary bond between a father and his son, amidst the pressures and emotions of those who would separate them.

Plot
Sid McCall is down on his luck. His greatest friend is his son Crispy and together they share all the joys and disappointments that street life can bring. Although only 6 years old, Crispy mixes easily with the street people, who share a common fellowship that always unites them during times of trouble.

Production
It was based on a true story.

References

External links

Australian television films
1985 television films
1985 films
Films directed by Paul Moloney
1980s English-language films